Matthew Hadden (born 7 June 1990) is an Ireland international rugby league footballer who plays as a  for Longhorn RL in the Ireland National League.

Playing career

Longhorns RL
On 2 January 2019 Hadden joined Longhorns RL from Rochdale Hornets

International
He was part of the Ireland squad at the 2013 Rugby League World Cup.

In October and November 2014, Matty played in the European Cup tournament.

In October and November 2015, Matty played in the 2015 European Cup tournament.

References

External links
Rochdale Hornets profile

2017 RLWC profile

1990 births
Living people
Antrim Eels players
Longhorns RL players
Ireland national rugby league team players
Irish rugby league players
Oxford Rugby League players
Rochdale Hornets players
Rugby league players from County Down
Rugby league props
Sportspeople from Belfast